Poix-de-Picardie (literally Poix of Picardy) is a commune in the Somme department in Hauts-de-France in northern France.

Geography
The commune has rail access at the Poix-de-Picardie station, on the Rouen to Amiens line.

Population

Places of interest
 The sixteenth century church of Saint-Denis’ priory. In flamboyant Gothic style, the base of the tower dates from the twelfth century. Before becoming the parish church, it was the chapel of the château.
 Military cemetery. Containing the graves of 149 Second World War Commonwealth aircrew.

Tyrrel family
The Tyrrel, or Tirel, family were Lords of Poix from the twelfth to the fifteenth century. The most famous member of this family was Walter Tirel, who killed King William Rufus of England, son of William the Conqueror; whether it was an accident or an assassination has never been established. Walter's grandson Hugh Tyrrel, baron of Castleknock, played a prominent role in the Norman Conquest of Ireland and in the Third Crusade.

See also
Communes of the Somme department

References

External links

 CWGC - Commonwealth War Graves Commission pages 
 Tourist Office of Poix  
 Fiche Station Verte de Poix-de-Picardie 

World War II sites in France
Communes of Somme (department)